South Sea, South Seas or Southsea may refer to:

Bodies of water 
 Pacific Ocean, originally named by European explorers Mar del Sur, or South Sea
 South Seas, a common name for the South Pacific
 The Southern Sea, an alternate name for the Gulf of Mexico, particularly during the Mexican-American War
 Southern Ocean or the Great Southern Ocean, the Antarctic Ocean and the South Polar Ocean
 South China Sea, encompassing an area from Singapore  to the Strait of Taiwan
 Namhae (sea) or South Sea, Korean name for body of water where the Yellow Sea meets Sea of Japan 
 Zuiderzee or Southern Sea, a reclaimed bay of the North Sea, now IJsselmeer, Netherlands

Geographic regions and populated places 
 Oceania, Australia and the islands east of Australia
 Nanyang (region), Chinese name for the geographical region south of China, particularly Southeast Asia
 Polynesia, also called the South Sea Islands
 South Seas Mandate, territories assigned to Japan by the League of Nations after World War I
 Southsea, a seaside resort in Portsmouth, England, UK
 Southsea, Wrexham, village in Wrexham, Wales, UK

Films and literature 
 South Seas (genre), a genre of literature and films taking place in Oceania or Pacific Islands
 South Sea Adventure, a 1952 children's book by Willard Price
 South Sea Bubble, a 1949 play by Noël Coward
 South Sea Love (1923 film), a 1923 American silent film
 South Sea Love (1927 film), a 1927 American silent drama film
 South Sea Rose, a 1921 American comedy-drama film
 South Sea Sinner, a 1950 American adventure film
 South Sea Tales, a 1911 collection of short stories by Jack London
 South Sea Woman, a 1953 American action-comedy-drama film
 Island Nights' Entertainments or South Sea Tales, a collection of short stories by Robert Louis Stevenson

Other 
 South Sea Bubble, speculation in the stock of The South Sea Company
 South Sea Company, a British joint-stock company that traded in South America during the 18th century
 South Sea Fleet, the Chinese naval fleet that operates in the South China Sea
 South Sea Islanders, Australian descendants of Pacific Islanders
 South Sea Roller Derby, an Australian roller derby league
 PS Southsea (1930), passenger vessel built for the Southern Railway in 1930
 Mare Australe or Southern Sea, lunar mare in the southeastern hemisphere of the Moon

See also 
 North Sea (disambiguation)
 East Sea (disambiguation)
 West Sea (disambiguation)
 Nanhai (disambiguation), meaning South Sea in Chinese
 Nankai (disambiguation), meaning South Sea in Japanese
 Namhae (disambiguation), meaning South Sea in Korean
 Southern Seas (disambiguation)
 Mar del Sur (disambiguation)